Alice Cullen,  (née McLaughlin; 18 March 1891 – 31 May 1969) was a Scottish Labour Party politician. She was the first female Roman Catholic Member of Parliament.

Early life
Educated at Lochwinnoch Elementary School, Cullen was a housewife, twice widowed, and married three times. She was a member of Glasgow Corporation from 1935 until 1945, and became a justice of the peace in 1941.

Political career
She was elected to the House of Commons as the Member of Parliament for the constituency of Glasgow Gorbals, which was safe for Labour, at a by-election in 1948. She competed with three men to secure the position, which was vacated due to the resignation of the previous MP, George Buchanan, who assumed the position of Chairman of the National Assistance Board.

She held the seat at subsequent general elections, until her death in 1969 at the age of 78. She was MP for Glasgow Gorbals at the time of "The Gorbals Vampire" incident in September 1954 when hundreds of schoolchildren went searching the Southern Necropolis cemetery armed with stakes to find a vampire with iron teeth. She led the city council in blaming horror comics and films for the incident. This resulted to a call for the ban of American horror comics to minors which she supported, along with all the other Glasgow MPs.

A play loosely based on this incident, The Gorbals Vampire, was performed at the Citizens Theatre in Glasgow in October 2016.

External links
Centre for Advancement of Women in politics: Alice Cullen

References

1891 births
1969 deaths
20th-century Scottish women politicians
20th-century Scottish politicians
Female members of the Parliament of the United Kingdom for Scottish constituencies
Gorbals
Members of the Parliament of the United Kingdom for Glasgow constituencies
Scottish justices of the peace
Scottish Labour MPs
Scottish Roman Catholics
UK MPs 1945–1950
UK MPs 1950–1951
UK MPs 1951–1955
UK MPs 1955–1959
UK MPs 1959–1964
UK MPs 1964–1966
UK MPs 1966–1970